The Second Legislative Assembly of Delhi was constituted in 1998 after Delhi Legislative Assembly election on 25 November 1998.

Election and government formation
Total seven national parties, eighteen state parties, fifty-five registered (unrecognized) parties and other independent candidates contested for 70 assembly seats. With 52 seats, INC emerged as the single largest party and formed with Sheila Dikshit as the Chief Minister. With 17 seats BJP was at second position and JDU with one, at third.

Electors

Candidates

List of members
Default sort, in ascending order of constituency

References

Indian politics articles by importance
Delhi Legislative Assembly